Luis Antonio Arevalo Espadas (born September 10, 1982, in Miguelturra) is a student and vision impaired S13/SB13/SM13/B3  swimmer from Spain. He competed at the 2000 Summer Paralympics, winning a bronze in the 4 × 100 meter relay 49 Points race. He raced at the 2004 Summer Paralympics. He also competed at the 2008 Summer Paralympics where he failed to medal.

References

External links 
  (2000, 2004)
  (2008)
 

1982 births
Living people
Paralympic bronze medalists for Spain
Paralympic medalists in swimming
Paralympic swimmers of Spain
Swimmers at the 2000 Summer Paralympics
Swimmers at the 2004 Summer Paralympics
Swimmers at the 2008 Summer Paralympics
Medalists at the 2000 Summer Paralympics
Spanish male freestyle swimmers
Spanish male breaststroke swimmers
Spanish male medley swimmers
S13-classified Paralympic swimmers